Clauneck (also called Claunt) is a goetic daemon appearing in the grimoires The Secrets of Solomon, Grimorium Verum and Dictionnaire Infernal. 

In Secrets of Solomon, the earliest known text in which he appears (18th-century), his name is rendered as "Claunth", and is said to be able "to give wealth, and to take it away". The book goes on to describe a ritual by which one invokes him alongside Lucifer to magically transform slips of parchment into gold coins.

Clauneck makes his most famous appearance in the Grimorium Verum, known from French and Italian copies dating from the 19th century. One of the eighteen Servitors of Syrach, Clauneck is said to be well loved by Lucifer, and he is summoned for his ability to bestow wealth, either by bringing money over a great distance or by assisting in the discovery of hidden treasure. Clauneck is the demon of wealth, known to be obedient to his summoners, but only to those who show him the proper respect.

References

Goetic demons